A Debt of Honour is a 1922 British silent drama film directed by Maurice Elvey and starring Isobel Elsom, Clive Brook and Sydney Seaward. It is based on a short story by Ethel M. Dell.

Cast
 Isobel Elsom as Hope Carteret
 Clive Brook as Walter Hyde
 Sydney Seaward as Major Bearing
 Lionelle Howard as Ronald Cartaret
 Lewis Gilbert as Proprietor
 Frank Goldsmith as Colonel Latimer
 Frances Peyton as Mrs. Latimer
 Hilda Sims as Ayah

Bibliography
 Low, Rachael. History of the British Film, 1918-1929. George Allen & Unwin, 1971.

External links

1922 films
1922 drama films
British drama films
British silent feature films
1920s English-language films
Films directed by Maurice Elvey
Films based on works by Ethel M. Dell
Films based on short fiction
British black-and-white films
Films set in England
Stoll Pictures films
1920s British films
Silent drama films